Adi-ugri or Adi-wegri (Tigrinya :ዓዲ ወግሪ) is a village in the former province of Seraye, Eritrea. The village is located some two kilometers from the city center of Mendefera to the west and is the origin of Mendefera city.

Adi-ugri has an estimated population of 2,500 people and is believed to be an ancient place that was founded during pre-Aksumite period in around the fifth century BCE.

References

Villages in Eritrea